Kertzfeld is a commune in the Bas-Rhin department in Grand Est in north-eastern France.

Geography
The village is positioned between Sélestat and Strasbourg.   Close by, across the main road that connects these two cities, is the village of Benfeld, and some twelve kilometres (seven miles) to the east of that are Rhinau and the Rhine river ferry crossing into Germany.

The departmental road RD5 runs through the village which is surrounded by farmland.

Christmas
A traditional Christmas market has been held since 1996 over the weekend roughly four weeks before Christmas.

See also
 Communes of the Bas-Rhin department

References

Communes of Bas-Rhin
Bas-Rhin communes articles needing translation from French Wikipedia